Amerila lucida is a nomen nudum moth taxon of the subfamily Arctiinae. It was described from Africa by Muller in 1980.

References

 , 1980): Some Afrotropical moths placed in the genera Diacrisia and Rhodogastria (Lepidoptera: Arctiidae: Arctiinae). – Amsterdam: Biologisch Laboratorium der Vrije Universiteit, 1980: 1-190.

Moths described in 1980
Amerilini
Moths of Africa